República is a restaurant in Portland, Oregon's Pearl District, in the United States.

Reception 
Kara Stokes and Maya MacEvoy included Cooperativa in Eater Portland 2022 overview of "Where to Eat and Drink in Portland’s Pearl District".

See also
 Hispanics and Latinos in Portland, Oregon
 List of Mexican restaurants

References

External links
 
 

Mexican restaurants in Portland, Oregon
Pearl District, Portland, Oregon
Year of establishment missing
Native American cuisine